Aldo Stella (Marostica, 11 July 1923 – Padua, 28 May 2007) was an Italian historian specialising in the Italian Anabaptist movement.

During World War II he fought in the Italian Resistance obtaining the Croce al Merito di Guerra.

Works
 Politica ed economia nel territorio trentino-tirolese dal XIII al XVII secolo, Padova 1958
 Chiesa e Stato nelle relazioni dei nunzi pontifici a Venezia, Città del Vaticano 1964
 Dall’anabattismo al socinianesimo nel Cinquecento veneto, Padova 1967
 Anabattismo e antitrinitarismo in Italia nel XVI secolo, Padova 1969
 La rivoluzione contadina del 1525 e l’utopia di Michael Gaismayr, Padova 1975
 Chiesa e Stato nelle relazioni dei nunzi pontifici a Venezia. Ricerche sul giurisdizionalismo veneziano dal XVI al XVIII secolo, Città del Vaticano 1981 
 Trento, Bressanone, Trieste, Torino 1987 
 Dall’anabattismo veneto al ‘Sozialevangelismus’ dei Fratelli Hutteriti e all’illuminismo religioso sociniano, Roma 1996
 Storia dell'autonomia trentina, Trento 1997 
 Storia d'Italia, vol. 17: I ducati padani, Trento e Trieste (con L. Marini e G. Tocci), Torino 1999 
 Il Bauernführer Michael Gaismair e l’utopia di un repubblicanesimo popolare, Bologna 1999 
 Dalle costituzioni degeneri nella Repubblica di Platone alla perfettibilità della Costituzione americana, Roma 2001
 Lepanto nella storia e nella storiografia alla luce di nuovi documenti, Padova 2007

References

1923 births
2007 deaths
20th-century Italian historians
Italian resistance movement members